Redemption is the second studio album by American Christian hip hop artist Derek Minor, then known as PRo, released on July 13, 2010 through his own label, Reflection Music Group. In promotion of the album, a short film, also titled Redemption, was released, and the track listing was announced on June 29, 2010. The album met with a mixed reception from critics - Bob Marovich of the Journal of Gospel Music praised the album, giving it a four out of five, but Brad Davis of Holy Culture was less favorable, rating the album six-and-a-half out of ten and stating that he disliked the new direction of PRo now that he partnered with Reach.

Track listing

References 

Derek Minor albums
2010 albums